Shahapur is a village in Belgaum district of Karnataka, India. It is now a suburb of Belgaum city.

References

Villages in Belagavi district